Cocomong is a Korean 3D animated children's program created by Olive Studio. Broadcast on EBS since 2008–2015, the animation "Fresh World, Cocomong" spurred the production of three series that started with Fresh World, Cocomong Season 1 in 2008, followed by the English education program Hello Cocomong Season 1 in 2010 and Hello Cocomong Season 2 in 2014. It then continued with Fresh World, Cocomong Season 2 in 2011, and ended with Cocomong Season 3 in 2015. This cartoon sets place in the imaginary Refrigerator Land, where everyday ingredients transform into half animal and half food friends who love a good adventure. A sausage-shaped monkey named Cocomong is the main character of this series. It is available in the US and UK on Netflix.

Characters 
 Cocomong, A sausage-shaped gorilla. He is the main character of the show. (Appears in all series)
 Robocong, Cocomong's robot. Cocomong dresses up as a prototype of him in the episode "I am Robocong". (Appears in Series 2 and 3)
 Aromi, An egg-shaped bunny who is Cocomong's girlfriend. (Appears in all series)
 Kaero, is a carrot-shaped unicorn. (Appears in all series)
 Agle, A cucumber-shaped dragon. (Appears in all series)
 Doori, An onion/mushroom-shaped bison. (Appears in all series)
 Padak, A celery-shaped terror bird. In the episode "Is Padak Really Sick?", she tends to pretend that she is sick. In Series one, the other characters refer to her with male pronouns, which has been an issue in many dubs of Korean shows. Thankfully, they started calling her with female pronouns in later Seasons (Appears in all series)
 Dookong, Saekong, Naekong, Three pea-shaped hogs, but in Season 2, they were changed to raccoons for some unknown reason. (Appear in all series)
 Tori (Korean: 토리; RR: toli), an acorn-shaped bird. (Appears only in Series 1)
 Tuni (Korean: 투니; RR: tuni) a killer fish. He is the new friend of Cocomong (Appears only in Series 3)
 Omong, Cocomong's shrimp-shaped pet dire wolf. (Appears in all series)
 Virus King, An orange and teal rat and is the villain that first appears in Series 2. (Appears in Series 2 and 3)
 Dark-pow, is Virus King's robot. (Only appears in Series 3)
 Candy-pow, A candy-shaped tiger who is Virus King's minion. (Appears in Series 2 and 3)
 Potato-pow, A potato-shaped rodent who is also Virus King's minion. (Appears in Series 2 and 3)

Voice Actors

Korean 

 Jeong Seon-Hye as Cocomong
 Jung Mira as Robocong
 Yang Jeong-hwa as Aromi
 Kim Jang as Kaero
 Shin Shin-Woo as Agle
 Hong Beom-Gi as Doori
 Lee Hyun-Jin as Tori
 Choi Joon-yeong as Dookong
 Lee Jae-Myung as Saekong
 Han Chae-eon as Naekong
 Hyeok Jeong as Omong and Tuni
 Jeon Tae-yeol as Virus King
 Jang Eon-Sook as Candy Pow
 Jung Yeong-woong as Potato Pow

English 

 Anna Paik as Cocomong
 Catherine Bommi Han as Aromi, Omong, and Tuni
 Mike Yantzi as Kaero and Virus King
 Unknown as Naekong (Season 1)
 Unknown as Tori
 Nancy Kim as Saekong and Candy Pow
 Josh Schwartzentruber as Agle, Dookong, and Potato Pow
 Anna Desmarais as Padak and Naekong (Season 2 and 3 only)
 Garan Fitzgerald as Doori

Episodes

Season 1 (2008)

Season 2 (2011)

Season 3 (2015)

References 

 Cocomong: Series Info
 :id:Cocomong

External links 
 올리브스튜디오 (Olive Studio)
 EBS 냉장고 나라 코코몽 홈페이지
 쥬니어 네이버 코코몽 홈페이지

South Korean children's animated fantasy television series
Animated preschool education television series